Puukkojunkkari ( Swedish: knivjunkare, translated to English as knife-fighter; literal translation: "knife junker") or häjy (Literal translation: "mean, wicked") was a term used of troublemakers who were active in the Southern Ostrobothnia region of Finland in the 19th century. Fights among puukkojunkkaris were common, and often resulted in death. Puukkojunkkaris usually made trouble at weddings, stole horses and circulated among towns and villages. They also participated in gambling and theft. The most notorious puukkojunkkaris lived in towns near the Lapuanjoki river, such as Alahärmä. The first homicides happened in the 1790s, but the infamous "golden age" of puukkojunkkaris lasted from the 1820s to the 1880s.

Puukkojunkkaris as social phenomenon

Puukkojunkkaris were present in all society classes. They included both free houseowners and farm servants. The houseowners were often gang leaders. Puukkojunkkaris were often feared and respected, and fought for their honour. The code of honour disallowed fear and respected fighting. Puukkojunkkaris were often difficult to prosecute because few people dared testify against them. Puukkojunkkaris also received admiration and respect because they dared to stand up against society and authorities.	

Many attempts have been made to explain the rise of puukkojunkkaris. In the 19th century, the living standard in Ostrobothnia rose, and because of this, weddings became grandiose events with alcohol consumed. Young men in Ostrobothnia did not often get a chance to inherit their own farm and earn their  own wealth, which led to frustration.

Theory of young men's rebellion
Reino Kallio's theory of knife-fighters is based on the idea of a counter reaction caused by social control that has been taken too far. He sees youth's violent behaviour as a protest-like rebellion against the pressure exercised by the power structure; particularly against local laws and parish discipline. The resistance that started as little more than slight mischief became branded as troublemakers and led to a path towards serious crimes. This was particularly due to the fact that parish discipline, which was stricter than general law, lowered the threshold of crime. At the time, there were many new ways of youngsters spending their free time, such as wandering around outdoors at night, which was considered a breach against the curfew and a threat to the existence of class society. Therefore, district courts started punishing people for curfew at night – as well as for other breakages against parish discipline.

The fundamentalist church and religious revivalist movements in the 18th and 19th centuries, such as pietism, also had a negative view towards young people's leisure activities due to moral reasons. This led to competition between different religious groups, first leading to tighter church discipline and then to parish discipline. The situation was brought to a head by the labour shortage due to tar and peatland burning cultivation that brought more tension to the working conditions, while the rich, house-owning population competed with each other, building baronial, 1.5 to 2-storey-high residential buildings. By invoking general regulations, masters could avoid disciplinary conflicts with their children or hirelings when there was labour shortage. Furthermore, increased drinking caused both problems to families and conflicts inside communities.

The disciplinary regulations that were normally confirmed by the governor limited and regulated in detail the already scarce free time that youngsters had: in addition to curfew at night, the celebration of dances, the publication of the bans of marriage and weddings, gatecrashing, moving, gathering, the use of spirits, cardplaying as well as general noisemaking and loitering. Because the young age groups usually took care of the heaviest physical work, conditional fines were introduced in the 19th century to prevent days off. In Lapua, Laihia and Mustasaari, not only farmhands, but also house-owners and crofters were banned from having free days.

At worst, parish discipline even led to group criminalisation of young people, as was the case in Kauhava and Vähäkyrö in the 1770s and 1780s, in Vöyri in the 1820s and 1830s, and in the greater parishes of Laihia and Lapua a couple of decades later. Parish discipline was implemented as group punishments, and they were only taken to court in certain parishes in southern Ostrobothnia, not elsewhere in Finland – except for a few possible exceptions. All in all, troublemaking was based on the background of a long-term crisis caused by a radical socio-economic change, which triggered youth violence due to the parish discipline managed and maintained by authorities. Finally, the emerged culture of violence also started feeding itself.

The model that Mr. Kallio used for the first time in his thesis in 1982 has also been called the youth rebellion theory. Its main sources include court minutes and document material from local archives. The theory approaches the stigmatisation theory that the internationally known sociologist, Mr. Anthony Giddens, considers to be one of the most important criminal theories. According to this theory, criminal behaviour is not a characteristic of an individual or a group, but rather an interactive process between criminals and non-criminals. The theory is based on the concept that no deed is criminal in itself, but the definition of crime constitutes a part of the exercise of power. An individual stigmatised as criminal is discriminated by authorities, which supports criminal behaviour and displacement from the mainstream population. A similar view can indirectly also be seen in the drama Pohjalaisia (Ostrobothnians).

Execution of parish laws and regulations

In the central parishes of both Finnish and Swedish-speaking southern Ostrobothnia, those who defended parish laws and regulations particularly directed their aims for power towards young working population, such as house-owners’, crofters’ and independent workers’ children, as well as soldiers and servants, who were in a socially subordinate position. Hundreds of them were fined for violations against parish discipline during the last three decades under the Swedish reign, so it was at the same time the first large-scale youth problem in the Finnish society that we know of.

On the local level, order was maintained by masters and, as trustees, mainly village aldermen and lay members of the courts, whose duty was to inform authorities of any violations against rules. Aldermen were sometimes even fined for neglecting their order maintaining duties. Many rural police chiefs also aimed at catching those guilty of violations against general order, and taking them to court. In the worst cases of public disorder, rural police chiefs had to call Russian armed forces, i.e. Cossacks, for help – one of them was even killed at a wedding in Lapua in 1862. Maintenance of order, and repetitive criminalisation after that, led to their displacement from the community. As a result, some of them considered themselves criminals, acted accordingly and even boasted of their criminal “heroic deeds”, which were sometimes also directed at rural police chiefs, priests and trustees. Santeri Alkio describes disturbances aimed at the last-mentioned group in his novel Puukkojunkkarit (Knife-fighters).

Notable puukkojunkkaris
 Antti Rannanjärvi
 Antti Isotalo
 Jaakko Jaakonpoika Hautamäki
 Jaakko Pukkila
 Juha Huhtamäki
 Juha Antinpoika Leskenantti
 Jukka Rannanjärvi
 Kaapo Sivula
 Tuomas Tuomaanpoika Lööpäri
 Matti Haapoja

Bibliography
 Kallio, Reino, Häiriköintiä ja henkirikoksia. Eteläpohjalaisnuoret paikallisen kurinpidon kohteena sääty-yhteiskunnan aikana. Helsinki 2009. .
 Kallio, Reino, Pohjanmaan suomenkielisten kylien oltermannihallinto. Tutkimus vuoden 1742 kyläjärjestysohjeen toteuttamisesta. Jyväskylä 1982. Jyväskylän yliopisto. Summary. .
 Paulaharju, Samuli: Härmän aukeilta. WSOY, 1947. .
 Pietiläinen, Timo: Kauhavan historia 1. Kivikaudesta kaupungintaloon. Kauhavan kaupunki, 1999. .
 Rajala, Juha, Kurittajia ja puukkosankareita. Väkivalta ja sen kontrollointi Kannaksen rajaseudulla 1885–1917. Helsinki 2004.SKS.
 Ylikangas, Heikki: Puukkojunkkareitten esiinmarssi. Väkivaltarikollisuus Etelä-Pohjanmaalla 1790–1825. Otava, Helsinki 1976.

See also 
 The Tough Ones (Häjyt), a 1999 film about puukkojunkkaris
 Härmä (film), a 2012 film about puukkojunkkaris

References

External links
 Official website of the municipality of Alahärmä

Social history of Finland
19th century in Finland
Crime in Finland
South Ostrobothnia